The Quantum Group of Funds are privately owned hedge funds based in London, New York,  Curaçao (Kingdom of the Netherlands) and Cayman Islands. They are advised by George Soros through his company Soros Fund Management. Soros started the fund in 1973 in partnership with Jim Rogers.

In 1987, the funds lost $800 million on Japanese stocks shortly before the October 19, 1987 stock market crash.

In 1992, the lead fund, Soros' Quantum Fund, became famous for 'breaking' the Bank of England, forcing it to devalue the pound. Soros had bet his entire fund in a short sale on the ultimately fulfilled prediction that the British currency would drop in value, a coup that netted him a profit of $1 billion, also known as Black Wednesday. In 1997, Soros was blamed for forcing sharp devaluations in Southeast Asian currencies.

On February 14, 1994, the funds had a major loss of $600 million in one day betting against the Japanese yen.

The fund lost US$2 billion in investments in Russia during the 1998 Russian financial crisis.

In July 2011, to avoid having to register with the SEC and comply with reporting requirements under the Dodd-Frank reform act, the Quantum Fund announced they would be turning the fund into a family investment group and returning all outside money to investors by the end of 2011. The fund is now managing Soros' family money as well as working with retail investors.

See also
  Svyazinvest

References

External links
 Quantum Group of Funds (Archived).

Hedge funds
George Soros